Kelvin Sebwe (born April 4, 1972 in Monrovia) is a Liberian retired footballer who played as a midfielder. Sebwe was also a member of the Liberia national football team. His brother is Dionysius Sebwe. He made his international debut against the Eagles of Mali on home soil in the 1988 African Nations Cup Qualifiers which his side lost 1–0 as a result of an early minute goal conceded.

Club career
A much-travelled player, Sebwe played for clubs in France, Belgium and the United Arab Emirates. However, he spent the major part of his career in Greece, where he played for 8 different clubs.

Retirement
Sebwe retired from football in June 2010.

References

External links 
 
 Kelvin Sebwe at Weltfussball.de  
 
 
 Kelvin Sebwe at LiberianSoccer.com
 

1972 births
Living people
Liberian footballers
Liberian expatriate footballers
Liberia international footballers
Association football midfielders
AS Monaco FC players
Super League Greece players
Xanthi F.C. players
AEK Athens F.C. players
Iraklis Thessaloniki F.C. players
Patraikos F.C. players
Panachaiki F.C. players
Kavala F.C. players
Panserraikos F.C. players
Doxa Drama F.C. players
Expatriate footballers in Monaco
Expatriate footballers in Greece
Expatriate footballers in the United Arab Emirates
Monrovia Black Star FC players
Toulouse FC players
Al Ahli Club (Dubai) players
Al Jazira Club players
1996 African Cup of Nations players
2002 African Cup of Nations players
Sportspeople from Monrovia
Liberian expatriate sportspeople in Monaco
UAE Pro League players